The Chicago mayoral election of 1995 resulted in the re-election of Democratic Party nominee incumbent Richard M. Daley over independent candidate Roland Burris, with 359,466 votes to Burris's 217,024. Daley won 60.1% of the total vote, winning by a landslide 24-point margin. The Republican candidate, Raymond Wardingley, fared poorly, with only 2.8% of the vote. The fourth nominee, Lawrence Redmond of the Harold Washington Party, won 0.9% of the votes.

This was the last election for Mayor of Chicago where candidates ran under party labels, as a state law was enacted later in 1995 making all municipal offices in the state non-partisan.

Nominations

Democratic primary
Daley easily defeated two challengers in the primary.

Daley's primary challenge came from Metropolitan Water Reclamation District of Greater Chicago Commissioner Joseph E. Gardner. Gardner had been a high-ranking member of Harold Washington's mayoral administration and an executive at PUSH.
By 1995 Sheila A. Jones had become a perennial competitor in the Democratic mayoral primary.

As was the case in all of his reelection campaigns, Daley did not attend any debates.

Daley vastly out-raised his opponents in campaign funds.

Endorsements

Results

Daley won a majority of the vote in 31 wards. Gardner won a majority of the vote in the remaining 19 wards.

Results by ward

Republican primary
Raymond Wardingley narrowly won the Republican nomination.

The Republican field was regarded as weak. Wardingly had worked as a clown under the name "Spanky the Clown". He had thrice before run for mayor.

Candidates Themis Anagost (an attorney), Leon Beard, and Raymond Lear had been denied inclusion on the ballot due to issues with their petitions.

Results

Results by ward

Harold Washington Party primary
Lawrence C. Redmond went unopposed in the Harold Washington Party primary.

Candidates Phillip Morris and Ilene Smith had been denied inclusion on the ballot due to issues regarding their petitions.

Results

Results by ward

Independent candidates
Roland Burris ran as an independent.

When first approached by black activists about running for mayor, Burris had declined. He ultimately ran, proclaiming to have been drafted by “the people”. By the time he decided to run, Joseph Gardner had already challenged Daley in the Democratic primary. Not wanting to run against Gardner and split the black vote in the primary, Burris decided he would run in the general election as an independent candidate.

General election
Daley did not attend any debates. Burris complained of a lack of media coverage on his candidacy. Late into the campaign, Burris issued demands for Daley to address corruption and misconduct by aviation employees, especially Dominic Longo, the manager of vehicle operations at O’Hare. The airport  had recently suffered a number of accidents caused by inexperienced runway crew leadership. Burris also alleged that Longo has coerced airport employees into making donations to the Daley campaign in order to keep their jobs. Daley's campaign spent $3 million in the election. Burris spent $250,000.

Endorsements

Polls

Results
Daley won a majority of the vote in 31 of the city's 50 wards. Burris won a majority of the vote in the remaining 19 wards. In response to Wardingley's abysmal showing, the Republican-controlled Illinois General Assembly passed legislation creating a nonpartisan, runoff election system for citywide offices in Chicago. Public Act 89-0095 was signed into law by Governor Jim Edgar and went into effect for the 1999 Chicago mayoral election.

Results by ward

References

1995
Chicago
1995 Illinois elections
1990s in Chicago
1995 in Illinois
Richard M. Daley